Yellow Springs High School is a public high school in Yellow Springs, Ohio. It is the only high school in the Yellow Springs Exempted Village Schools district, teaching grades 9-12. Their mascot is a bulldog.

The school is part of the Metro Buckeye Conference in Ohio. The sports played by the high school's athletic teams are soccer, volleyball, track and field, cross country, basketball, softball, baseball, swimming, tennis, and bowling.

History
From 1858 until 1872, the high school met in Yellow Springs' South School.

Ohio High School Athletic Association State Championships

 Boys Track and Field – 1975, 1985, 1990, 1992, 1993, 1996, 1997

External links
 District Website

References

High schools in Greene County, Ohio
Public high schools in Ohio